Fontignano is a frazione of the comune of  Perugia, Italy, located near Lake Trasimeno.

The famous High Renaissance painter Pietro Perugino died of the plague in Fontignano in 1524 and some of his masterpieces are still preserved in Fontignano.

The Renaissance painter Matteo Balducci was born in Fontignano.

Frazioni of Perugia